Stars & Stripes 88 is an American catamaran that successfully defended the 1988 America's Cup.

Stars & Stripes won against KZ1 with 2–0 in matches.

References

America's Cup defenders
1980s sailing yachts
Sailing yachts built in the United States